Erdőfalva is the Hungarian name for two villages in Romania:

 Ardeova village, Mănăstireni Commune, Cluj County
 Ardeu village, Balșa Commune, Hunedoara County